Carlos Alfredo Arce (born 16 September 1990) is an Argentine professional footballer who plays as a midfielder for Barracas Central.

Career
Arce began his career with Barracas Central. He started featuring at senior level from 2009 in Primera C Metropolitana, making forty-six appearances across the 2008–09 and 2009–10 seasons; with the latter concluding with promotion to Primera B Metropolitana. His first goals in the third tier came in 2010–11 as he netted against Comunicaciones and Atlanta. After nine campaigns in the division, as he took his overall tally for the club to nine goals in three hundred and eleven matches, Barracas Central were promoted to Primera B Nacional as champions in 2018–19.

Career statistics
.

Honours
Barracas Central
Primera C Metropolitana: 2009–10

Primera B Metropolitana: 2018–19

References

External links

1990 births
Living people
Footballers from Buenos Aires
Argentine footballers
Association football midfielders
Primera C Metropolitana players
Primera B Metropolitana players
Primera Nacional players
Barracas Central players